Thalictrum pubescens, the king of the meadow or tall meadow-rue, is a plant in the buttercup family, Ranunculaceae.

Description
Thalictrum pubescens is a herbaceous plant with alternate, pinnately compound leaves, on hollow, green stems. The flowers are white, borne in spring and summer.

Distribution
The range of this plant includes most of eastern Canada and United States excluding Florida.

References

pubescens
Plants described in 1813
Flora of North America